Filion is a surname. Notable people with the surname include:

 Amaury Filion (born 1981), Dominican basketballer
 Gérard Filion (1909–2005), Canadian businessman and journalist
 Hervé Filion (1940–2017), Canadian harness racing driver
 Jean Filion (born 1951), Canadian politician
 John Filion (born 1950), Toronto city councillor
 Louise Filion (born 1945), Canadian biogeographer
 Maurice Filion (1932–2017), Canadian ice hockey coach
 Richard Filion, Canadian administrator
 Roseline Filion (born 1987), Canadian diver

See also
 Fillion, surname
 Fillon (surname)